Acacia pelophila is a shrub of the genus Acacia and the subgenus Plurinerves that is endemic to a small area along the west coast of western Australia.

Description
It has resinous new growth and angled, glabrous and cylindrical branchlets. Like most species of Acacia it has phyllodes rather than true leaves. The evergreen, glabrous and leathery phyllodes are ascending to erect and have a linear-oblanceolate shape and are straight to slightly incurved. It blooms from July to September and produces yellow flowers. The firmly chartaceous to thinly leathery seed pods that form after flowering have a linear to string of bead shape and are straight to shallowly curved.

Taxonomy
The species was first formally described by the botanists Richard Sumner Cowan and Bruce Maslin as a part of the work Acacia miscellany. Miscellaneous new taxa and lectotypifications in Western Australian Acacia, mostly section Plurinerves (Leguminosae: Mimosoideae) as published in the journal Nuytsia. It was reclassified by Leslie Pedley in 2003 as Racosperma pelophilum then transferred back to genus Acacia in 2006.
It is quite closely related to Acacia sclerophylla and less closely to Acacia spongolitica and superficially resembles Acacia lanei.

Distribution
It is native to a small area in the Mid West region of Western Australia where it is often situated along saline creeklines. It has a limited range to the north west of Northampton growing in clay soils as a part of in mixed shrubland communities.

See also
List of Acacia species

References

pelophila
Acacias of Western Australia
Taxa named by Bruce Maslin
Plants described in 1999
Taxa named by Richard Sumner Cowan